CAAX prenyl protease 2 is an enzyme that in humans is encoded by the RCE1 gene.

This gene encodes an integral membrane protein which is classified as a member of the metalloproteinase family.  This enzyme is thought to function in the maintenance and processing of CAAX-type prenylated proteins.

References

Further reading